Alieu is a West African male given name, which means "strong" and has its origins with the Fula people. It was a common name in the Fulani royal families and used to be reserved for royalty. This practice has continued in many Fulani clans today, most notably the Barry, Bah and Jallow clans. Alieu is a traditional male name in Gambia. The name may refer to:

Alieu Badara Saja Taal (1944–2014), Gambian academic and politician
Alieu Darbo (born 1992), Gambian soccer player
Alieu Njie (born 1955), American soccer player
Alieu Touray-Saidy (born 1976), Gambian soccer player

References

African masculine given names